The Zivko Edge 540 manufactured by Zivko Aeronautics is a highly aerobatic aircraft. Capable of a 420 degree per second roll rate and a 3,700 foot per minute climb rate, it has been flown to victory on the international Unlimited aerobatics circuit several times since the mid-1990s. A tandem-seat version is sold as the Edge 540T.

The Zivko Edge 540 is the most common aircraft used in the Red Bull Air Race World Series.

Specifications (Edge 540)

See also

References

External links

 Zivko aircraft family
 Red Bull Air Race
 Sport Aviation pilot report
 Photos at Airliners.net
 Melissa Aerobatics Team from Melissa Andrejewski Pemberton

Racing aircraft
1990s United States sport aircraft
Aerobatic aircraft
Single-engined tractor aircraft
Mid-wing aircraft
Conventional landing gear